The South of Scotland Championships  also known as the South of Scotland Lawn Tennis Championships  was a men's and women's grass court tennis tournament first staged in 1882 at the Beachgrove Grounds, Moffat, Dumfriesshire, Scotland. The championships ran as part of the international worldwide tour until 1967.

History
South of Scotland Championships was first held in the early 1880s on the grass courts of Beechgrove Lawn Tennis Club in Moffat in Southern Scotland. No tournament was held in the years 1895-1907 due to Moffat being the host for the Scottish Lawn Tennis Championships. The championships ran as part of the international worldwide tour until 1967.

Since no longer a part of the worldwide tennis tour a smaller South of Scotland Championships tournament is still held at Beechgrove Tennis Club in Moffat. The modern tournament is held on hard courts.

Venue
The grounds at Beechgrove were laid out in 1870. The original Beechgrove Lawn Tennis Club in Moffat was one of the founding members of the Scottish Lawn Tennis Association (now Tennis Scotland) in 1895.

References

External links
https://clubspark.lta.org.uk/LTA Clubs: Beechgrove Tennis Club

Defunct tennis tournaments in the United Kingdom
Grass court tennis tournaments
Tennis tournaments in Scotland